Huni Valley formerly known as Tinkwakrom is a small town in the Prestea-Huni Valley District of the Western Region in west central Ghana. It is one of the Wassa groups and a divisional arm to the Wassa Fiase people. They are the Bosomtwi traditional group and led by Nana Kwanena Amponsah IV.

Transport

Rail 
Huni Valley is a junction on the west line for a cross country line to the east line.

Huni Valley is also the site of a concrete sleeper plant, which was built in 2008 to provide sleepers for the upgrade and extension of the west line to Hamile near the Ghana and  Burkina Faso border.

See also 
 Railway stations in Ghana
 Transport in Ghana

References

External links 

 

Populated places in the Western Region (Ghana)